Titin  (contraction for Titan protein) (also called connectin) is a protein that in humans is encoded by the TTN gene. Titin is a giant protein, greater than 1 µm in length, that functions as a molecular spring that is responsible for the passive elasticity of muscle. It comprises 244 individually folded protein domains connected by unstructured peptide sequences. These domains unfold when the protein is stretched and refold when the tension is removed.

Titin is important in the contraction of striated muscle tissues. It connects the Z line to the M line in the sarcomere. The protein contributes to force transmission at the Z line and resting tension in the I band region. It limits the range of motion of the sarcomere in tension, thus contributing to the passive stiffness of muscle. Variations in the sequence of titin between different types of striated muscle (cardiac or skeletal) have been correlated with differences in the mechanical properties of these muscles.

Titin is the third most abundant protein in muscle (after myosin and actin), and an adult human contains approximately 0.5 kg of titin.  With its length of ~27,000 to ~35,000 amino acids (depending on the splice isoform), titin is the largest known protein.  Furthermore, the gene for titin contains the largest number of exons (363) discovered in any single gene, as well as the longest single exon (17,106 bp).

Discovery 

In 1954, Reiji Natori proposed the existence of an elastic structure in muscle fiber to account for the return to the resting state when muscles are stretched and then released. In 1977, Koscak Maruyama and coworkers isolated an elastic protein from muscle fiber that they called connectin.  Two years later, Kuan Wang and coworkers identified a doublet band on electrophoresis gel corresponding to a high molecular weight, elastic protein that they named titin.

In 1990, Siegfried Labeit isolated a partial cDNA clone of titin.  Five years later, Labeit and Bernhard Kolmerer determined the cDNA sequence of human cardiac titin. In 2001, Labeit and colleagues determined the complete sequence of the human titin gene.

Genetics 

The human gene encoding for titin is located on the long arm of chromosome 2 and contains 363 exons, which together code for 38,138 amino acid residues (4200 kDa). Within the gene are found a large number of PEVK (proline-glutamate-valine-lysine -abundant structural motifs) exons 84 to 99 nucleotides in length, which code for conserved 28- to 33-residue motifs that may represent structural units of the titin PEVK spring. The number of PEVK motifs in the titin gene appears to have increased during evolution, apparently modifying the genomic region responsible for titin's spring properties.

Isoforms 

A number of titin isoforms are produced in different striated muscle tissues as a result of alternative splicing.  All but one of these isoforms are in the range of ~27,000 to ~36,000 amino acid residues in length. The exception is the small cardiac novex-3 isoform, which is only 5,604 amino acid residues in length. The following table lists the known titin isoforms:

Structure 

Titin is the largest known protein; its human variant consists of 34,350 amino acids, with the molecular weight of the mature "canonical" isoform of the protein being approximately 3,816,030.05 Da. Its mouse homologue is even larger, comprising 35,213 amino acids with a molecular weight of 3,906,487.6 Da. It has a theoretical isoelectric point of 6.02. The protein's empirical chemical formula is C169,719H270,466N45,688O52,238S911. It has a theoretical instability index (II) of 42.38, classifying the protein as unstable. The protein's in vivo half-life, the time it takes for half of the amount of protein in a cell to break down after its synthesis in the cell, is predicted to be approximately 30 hours (in mammalian reticulocytes).

The Titin protein is located between the myosin thick filament and the Z disk. Titin consists primarily of a linear array of two types of modules, also referred to as protein domains (244 copies in total): type I fibronectin type III domain (132 copies) and type II immunoglobulin domain (112 copies). However, the exact number of these domains is different in different species. This linear array is further organized into two regions:

 N-terminal I-band: acts as the elastic part of the molecule and is composed mainly of type II modules.  More specifically the I-band contains two regions of tandem type II immunoglobulin domains on either side of a PEVK region that is rich in proline (P), glutamate (E), valine (V) and lysine (K).
 C-terminal A-band: is thought to act as a protein-ruler and is composed of alternating type I (Fn3) and II (Ig) modules with super-repeat segments. These have been shown to align to the 43 nm axial repeats of myosin thick filaments with immunoglobulin domains correlating to myosin crowns.

The C-terminal region also contains a serine kinase domain that is primarily known for adapting the muscle to mechanical strain. It is “stretch-sensitive” and helps repair overstretching of the sarcomere. The N-terminal (the Z-disc end) contains a "Z repeat" that recognizes Actinin alpha 2.

The elasticity of the PEVK region has both entropic and enthalpic contributions and is characterized by a polymer persistence length and a stretch modulus. At low to moderate extensions PEVK elasticity can be modeled with a standard worm-like chain (WLC) model of entropic elasticity. At high extensions PEVK stretching can be modeled with a modified WLC model that incorporates enthalpic elasticity. The difference between low-and high- stretch elasticity is due to electrostatic stiffening and hydrophobic effects.

Embedded between the PEVK and Ig residues are N2A domains.

Evolution 
The titin domains have evolved from a common ancestor through many gene duplication events. Domain duplication was facilitated by the fact that most domains are encoded by single exons. Other giant sarcomeric proteins made out of Fn3/Ig repeats include obscurin and myomesin. Throughout evolution, titin mechanical strength appears to decrease through the loss of disulfide bonds as the organism becomes heavier.

Titin A-band has homologs in invertebrates, such as twitchin (unc-22) and projectin, which also contain Ig and FNIII repeats and a protein kinase domain. The gene duplication events took place independently but were from the same ancestral Ig and FNIII domains. It is said that the protein titin was the first to diverge out of the family. Drosophila projectin, officially known as bent (bt), is associated with lethality by failing to escape the egg in some mutations as well as dominant changes in wing angles.

Drosophila Titin, also known as Kettin or sallimus (sls), is kinase-free. It has roles in the elasticity of both muscle and chromosomes. It is homologous to vertebrate titin I-band and contains Ig PEVK domains, the many repeats being a hot target for splicing. There also exists a titin homologue, ttn-1, in C. elegans. It has a kinase domain, some Ig/Fn3 repeats, and PEVT repeats that are similarly elastic.

Function 

Titin is a large abundant protein of striated muscle. Titin's primary functions are to stabilize the thick filament, center it between the thin filaments, prevent overstretching of the sarcomere, and to recoil the sarcomere like a spring after it is stretched. An N-terminal Z-disc region and a C-terminal M-line region bind to the Z-line and M-line of the sarcomere, respectively, so that a single titin molecule spans half the length of a sarcomere. Titin also contains binding sites for muscle-associated proteins so it serves as an adhesion template for the assembly of contractile machinery in muscle cells. It has also been identified as a structural protein for chromosomes. Considerable variability exists in the I-band, the M-line and the Z-disc regions of titin. Variability in the I-band region contributes to the differences in elasticity of different titin isoforms and, therefore, to the differences in elasticity of different muscle types. Of the many titin variants identified, five are described with complete transcript information available.

Dominant mutation in TTN causes predisposition to hernias.

Titin interacts with many sarcomeric proteins including:
 Z line region: telethonin and alpha-actinin
 I band region: calpain-3 and obscurin
 M line region: myosin-binding protein C, calmodulin 1, CAPN3, and MURF1

Clinical relevance 

Mutations anywhere within the unusually long sequence of this gene can cause premature stop codons or other defects.  Titin mutations are associated with hereditary myopathy with early respiratory failure, early-onset myopathy with fatal cardiomyopathy, core myopathy with heart disease, centronuclear myopathy, limb-girdle muscular dystrophy type 2J, familial dilated cardiomyopathy 9, hypertrophic cardiomyopathy and tibial muscular dystrophy. Further research also suggests that no genetically linked form of any dystrophy or myopathy can be safely excluded from being caused by a mutation on the TTN gene.  Truncating mutations in dilated cardiomyopathy patients are most commonly found in the A region; although truncations in the upstream I region might be expected to prevent translation of the A region entirely, alternative splicing creates some transcripts that do not encounter the premature stop codon, ameliorating its effect. mRNA splicing factors such as RBM20 and SLM2 (KHDRBS3) were shown to mediated alternative mRNA splicing of titin mRNA contributing to the development of heart failure due to cardiomyopathies.

Autoantibodies to titin are produced in patients with the autoimmune disease Myasthenia gravis.

Interactions 

Titin has been shown to interact with:

 ANK1,
 ANKRD1,
 ANKRD23
 CAPN3,
 FHL2,
 OBSCN,
 TCAP, and
 TRIM63.

Linguistic significance 

The name titin is derived from the Greek Titan (a giant deity, anything of great size).

As the largest known protein, titin also has the longest IUPAC name of a protein. The full chemical name of the human canonical form of titin, which starts methionyl... and ends ...isoleucine, contains 189,819 letters and is sometimes stated to be the longest word in the English language, or of any language. However, lexicographers regard generic names of chemical compounds as verbal formulae rather than English words.

References

Further reading

External links 

  GeneReviews/NIH/NCBI/UW entry on Familial Hypertrophic Cardiomyopathy Overview
  GeneReviews/NCBI/NIH/UW entry on Udd Distal Myopathy, Tibial Muscular Dystrophy, Udd Myopathy
  GeneReviews/NIH/NCBI/UW entry on Salih Myopathy or Early-Onset Myopathy with Fatal Cardiomyopathy
 InterPro domain organization of titin

Structural proteins
Genes on human chromosome 2
EC 2.7.11
Muscular system